The Sigma 105mm 2.8 EX DG is a macro lens produced by Sigma Corporation. The lens has six different variates, fitting on the Sigma SA mount, Canon EF mount, Four Thirds System, Pentax K mount, Minolta A-mount, and the Nikon F-mount.

References

105mm f/2.8 EX DG
Macro lenses